The Arizona Republican Party is the affiliate of the Republican Party in Arizona. Its headquarters are in Phoenix. The party currently controls six of Arizona's nine U.S. House seats, sixteen of thirty State House of Representatives seats, thirty-one of sixty State Senate seats, four of five seats on the Arizona Corporation Commission and three Statewide Executive Offices (State Treasurer, Superintendent of Public Instruction, and State Mine Inspector).

Current structure 

Here is the structure of the state party, as of Feb 2019.

Elected officers of the State Committee

State Executive Committee

State Committee 
 The 15 county Republican chairmen
 One member for each three elected Republican PCs

The Chairman, Secretary and Treasurer elected at the biannual Statutory Meeting and other officers elected at the biannual Mandatory Meeting (except National Committeeman and Committeewoman, who are elected at quadrennial State Convention).

County committees 
County committees include all PCs within that county. They meet in January after general elections to elect a chairman, two vice chairs, a secretary and a treasurer.

Legislative district committees 
Legislative district committees exist in counties of more than 500,000 people (Maricopa and Pima Counties), and include all PCs within that district. Officers are elected at Organizational Meetings
after the general election including a chairman, two vice chairs, a secretary and a treasurer.

Precinct committeemen 
Precinct committeemen are elected one per precinct, plus one additional for each 125 registered voters of that party as of March 1 of the general election year. There are over 1,666 precincts statewide (including over 724 precincts in Maricopa County.)

Federal officials 
These are the Republican Party members who hold federal offices.

U.S. Senate 
 None

Both of Arizona's U.S. Senate seats have been held the Democratic caucus since 2020. Martha McSally was the last Republican to represent Arizona in the U.S. Senate. Appointed in 2019 by Governor Doug Ducey after the resignation of Jon Kyl who was appointed to the seat after the death of John McCain in 2018, McSally lost the 2020 special election to determine who would serve the remainder of the term expiring in 2022. McSally lost the special election to Democratic challenger Mark Kelly, who ran for a full term in 2022, defeating Blake Masters. John McCain was the last Republican elected to represent Arizona in the U.S. Senate in 2016, while Jeff Flake was the last Republican to represent Arizona for a full term in the U.S. Senate from 2013 to 2013.

U.S. House of Representatives 
Out of the nine seats Arizona is apportioned in the U.S. House of Representatives, six are held by Republicans:
 AZ-01: David Schweikert
 AZ-02: Eli Crane
 AZ-05: Andy Biggs
 AZ-06: Juan Ciscomani
 AZ-08: Debbie Lesko
 AZ-09: Paul Gosar

State officials

Executive 
The Arizona Republican Party controls 7 of 11 elected statewide executive offices:

Senate 
The Arizona Republican Party holds the majority in the Arizona Senate, holding 16 of the 30 seats.

House 
The Arizona Republican Party holds the majority in the Arizona House of Representatives, holding 31 of the 60 seats.

Mayors 

 Gail Barney (Queen Creek)
 Bob Barrett (Peoria)
 Kenny Evans (Payson)
 Ed Honea (Marana)
 John Insalaco (Apache Junction)
 Bridgette Petersen (Gilbert)
 Scott LeMarr (Paradise Valley)
 Michael LeVault (Youngtown)
 Georgia Lord (Goodyear)
 Mark Nexsen (Lake Havasu City)
 Lana Mook (El Mirage)
 Christian Price (Maricopa)
 Thomas Schoaf (Litchfield Park)
 Thomas Shope (Coolidge)
 Greg Mengarelli (Prescott)
 John Giles (Mesa)
 Kevin Hartle

History

Chairmen

Election results

Presidential

Gubernatorial

Former prominent Arizona Republicans

United States delegates

United States senators

United States representatives

Territorial governors

State governors

See also 

 Arizona Democratic Party
 Arizona Libertarian Party
 Arizona Green Party
 Political party strength in Arizona
 Constitution Party of Arizona

References

External links 
 Arizona Republican Party Website
 Arizona Federation of Republican Women
 Arizona Latino Republican Assembly
 Arizona College Republicans
 Maricopa County Republican Committee

Republican Party
Arizona
Political parties in Arizona
Far-right politics in the United States